Mario César Rodríguez Madrid (born July 31, 1975) is a retired Honduran football midfielder.

Club career
Rodríguez started his career at Real España and played for several Honduran clubs during his career.

International career
Rodríguez made his debut for Honduras in a March 1999 UNCAF Nations Cup match against Belize and has earned a total of 26 caps, scoring 1 goal. He has represented his country in 1 FIFA World Cup qualification match and played at the 1999 and 2009 UNCAF Nations Cups as well as at the 2007 CONCACAF Gold Cup. He also played at the 2001 Copa América.

His final international was a February 2009 FIFA World Cup qualification match against Costa Rica.

International goals

|}

References

External links

1975 births
Living people
People from Cortés Department
Association football midfielders
Honduran footballers
Honduras international footballers
2001 Copa América players
2007 CONCACAF Gold Cup players
2009 UNCAF Nations Cup players
Real C.D. España players
C.D. Victoria players
Deportes Savio players
F.C. Motagua players
Platense F.C. players
Liga Nacional de Fútbol Profesional de Honduras players